Frisian language may refer to:

The Frisian languages, a closely related group of six Germanic languages:
West Frisian languages (fry), a family of four Frisian languages spoken in the Netherlands and often known there simply as the Frisian language
Hindeloopen Frisian, spoken in the city of Hindeloopen and the village of Molkwerum in the Netherlands
Schiermonnikoog Frisian, spoken on the island of Schiermonnikoog, Netherlands
Terschelling Frisian, spoken on the island of Terschelling, Netherlands. Terschelling Frisian, along with Westlauwers Frisian, form the Westlauwers–Terschellings language family
Westlauwers Frisian (fry), or Western Frisian, spoken throughout West Frisia moreso than any of the other West Frisian languages. 
Saterland Frisian (stq), or East Frisian language, spoken in Lower Saxony, Germany
North Frisian (frr), spoken in Schleswig-Holstein, Germany
East Frisian Low Saxon (frs), the West Low German dialect of East Frisia, Lower Saxony, Germany. The name Frisia specifically refers to the region not its provenance, as the dialect is not a Frisian dialect but a Saxon one.